Freaks, Geeks, and Asperger Syndrome: A User Guide to Adolescence is a non-fiction book about Asperger syndrome published in 2003. The then 13-year-old author, Luke Jackson, has Asperger syndrome himself. Jackson wrote the book because he felt there was not enough useful information on the Internet about the subject.

Jackson is the son of fellow writer Jacqui Jackson, and most of his siblings have similar difficulties.

Reception
David Worling of the Canadian Academy of Child and Adolescent Psychiatry said that the book is filled with valuable information and is useful to have in a clinical library.

The book received first place in Times Educational Supplement awards in 2003 for special educational needs books.

Other works and sequel

About the same time as  Freaks, Geeks & Asperger Syndrome, Jackson wrote  A User Guide to the GF/CF Diet: For Autism, Asperger Syndrome and ADHD.

Jackson has written a column on the BBC's ouch!.. it's a disability thing.

In 2016, Jackson wrote a sequel to Freaks, Geeks & Asperger Syndrome,  Sex, Drugs and Asperger's Syndrome (ASD): A User Guide to Adulthood.

Jackson has written a poetry book titled Crystalline Lifetime: Fragments of Asperger's Syndrome, (2006).

References

External links
Freaks, Geeks & Asperger Syndrome: A User Guide to Adolescence (BMJ Publishing Group)
Book Review: Freaks, Geeks and Asperger Syndrome – A User Guide to Adolescence (About.com)
At times I feel as though I come from another planet (Telegraph)

Books about autism
2002 non-fiction books